Mehmet Nadir Ünal (born 13 January 1993) is a Turkish kickboxer specialized in the K-1 event, and amateur boxer competing in the light heavyweight (-81 kg) division. He is a member of Fenerbahçe Boxing in Istanbul.

Ünal was born in Adana on 13 January 1993.  He moved with his family to Konya, where he began boxing at age of 14.

He won the bronze medal in the K-1 event at the 2012 WAKO European Senior Kickboxing Championships in Ankara, Turkey.

He earned a quota spot for 2016 Summer Olympics after taking a bronze medal at the 2016 European Boxing Olympic Qualification Tournament in Samsun, Turkey.

References

1993 births
Sportspeople from Adana
Light heavyweight kickboxers
Turkish male kickboxers
Turkish male boxers
Light-heavyweight boxers
Fenerbahçe boxers
Living people
Boxers at the 2016 Summer Olympics
Olympic boxers of Turkey
21st-century Turkish people